The 2020 AFL Women's season was the fourth season of the AFL Women's competition, the highest level senior Australian rules football competition in Australia.

The season ran from 7 February until 22 March. It was intended to comprise an 8-game home-and-away season followed by a finals series featuring the top six clubs; however, the onset of the COVID-19 pandemic in March 2020 saw the season curtailed and finally abandoned. No premiership was awarded.

Background

New teams

Collective bargaining agreement
Prior to the season commencing a collective bargaining agreement failed to pass the player's association, with only 70% agreeing, falling short of the required 75% threshold. One of the demands of the dissenters was to have a longer season, so that all the teams could play each other once. The players later voted with a vote of 98% to agree to a revised agreement, which steadily increased the number of matches to be played over three years.

Conference system
The conference system utilised in the previous season was retained for this season, though it was expanded to cater for the additional teams. Seven teams were placed in each of the two conferences, with teams playing all their intra-conference rivals once and two cross-over matches against teams from the other conference, resulting in an 8-round home and away season. The placing of the teams was determined by the AFL with competitiveness, list assessments and the previous season's results in mind.

Impact of 2019–20 coronavirus pandemic
The 2020 season was disrupted and then brought to an early end by the COVID-19 pandemic, which was formally declared a pandemic on 11 March 2020, prior to Round 6. The pandemic had the following effects on the season:
 All matches played from 14 March onwards were played to empty stadiums.
 The final two rounds of the home-and-away season were scratched and the finals brought forward by two weeks, being played based on ladder positions at the time.
 The finals series was expanded from six teams to eight. Under the original schedule, the top team in each conference was to advance directly to the preliminary finals while the second and third placed teams played off in semi-finals; but under the modified system, the fourth placed teams also qualified, and faced the first placed teams in semi-finals. Partway through the finals series, it was announced that no premiership will be awarded after the Victorian government announced a shutdown of all non-essential operations on 22 March 2020.

Premiership season
The originally scheduled eight-round fixture and make-up of the conferences was released on 29 October 2019.
 All starting times are Australian Eastern Time.
  home games originally scheduled at the Swinburne Centre, the club's home ground, were later moved to Ikon Park out of concerns for crowd capacity.

Round 1

Round 2

Round 3

Round 4

Round 5

Round 6

Ladders

Ladder progression
Numbers highlighted in green indicates the team finished the round inside the top 3.
Numbers highlighted in blue indicates the team finished in first place in the conference for that round.	
Numbers highlighted in red indicates the team finished in last place in the conference for that round.

Win/loss table

Bold – Home game
Opponent for round listed above margin
This table can be sorted by margin, winners are represented in the first half of each column, and losers are represented in the second half of each column once sorted

Finals series

Semi finals

Awards

League awards
There was no Grand Final best on ground medal awarded, as the match was not played on account of the season's early termination due to the coronavirus pandemic.
AFLW Players Association awards
The most valuable player was awarded to Jasmine Garner.
The most courageous player was awarded to Kiara Bowers.
The best captain was awarded to Daisy Pearce.
The best first year player was awarded to Georgia Patrikios.
The AFLW Coaches Association champion player of the year was awarded to Jasmine Garner.
Karen Paxman was named captain of the All-Australian team. Twelve of the fourteen clubs had at least one representative in the 21-woman team.
 were the lowest ranked team overall, and thus could be said to have "won" the wooden spoon, though this is a contestable claim given the use of conferences.

Best and fairests

AFLW leading goalkicker
Numbers highlighted in blue indicates the player led the season's goal kicking tally at the end of that round. The total is updated following the conclusion of the round.

Source

Coach changes

Club leadership

See also
2019 AFL Women's draft

References

External links
 Official AFL Women's website

 
AFL Women's seasons
AFL Women's season

AFL Women's season 2020